Morris Goldberg is a South African saxophonist who is recognised as one of the early pioneers of Cape Jazz, along with Dollar Brand and Chris McGregor.

Biography
Born in Cape Town, Goldberg grew up in Observatory, a suburb of Cape Town. He left South Africa in the apartheid years to study at the Manhattan School of Music, where he received both bachelor's and master's degrees. Now based in New York City, he is also a virtuoso clarinet and flute player. He has recorded a number of his own albums and is known as a member of the Harry Belafonte band and for his work with Paul Simon. He also played in the band on The Rosie O'Donnell Show.

Goldberg has toured and recorded albums with his own band, Ojoyo. He calls their sound safrojazz, presenting the music as a combination of South African and American jazz music.

Discography
 Jazz in Transit (2006)
 Forward Motion (2003)
 Played on Tony Bird's Sorry Africa (1990)
 Uptownship (1989) with Hugh Masekela
 Played on Paul Simon's "You Can Call Me Al" (1986)
 Played on Dollar Brand's "Mannenberg" (1974)

References

 CD - Jazz in Transit - Live concert re-issue. 2006

External links
 Ojoyo website

21st-century saxophonists
Living people
Musicians from Cape Town
South African expatriates in the United States
South African jazz saxophonists
Year of birth missing (living people)